G.a.S – Gangsta and Street 2 is the second mixtape by rappers Young Buck & Tha City Paper. The mixtape features exclusive tracks and freestyles from Tha City Paper & Young Buck. It was released on May 27, 2013.

Track listing

References

External links
 

2013 mixtape albums
Young Buck albums
Albums produced by Drumma Boy